Farah Kosh or Farah Kash or Farakash may refer to:

Farah Kosh-e Olya
Farah Kosh-e Sofla